Karnam Chengalvaraya Pillai (1900–1970) was a bishop, Antiochean Succession, Chennai (Madras), India. He spent the last twenty years of his life in the United States of America on a special mission to acquaint Christians with the orientalisms of the Bible. He wrote books and worked with western Christians to help clarify what he believed were difficult Scriptural passages through an understanding of the eastern manners and customs. During his time in the United States, he became associated with Victor Paul Wierwille, the founding president of The Way International and according to the book Born Again to Serve by the American Christian Press, Pillai and Wierwille worked through every orientalism in the Bible from Genesis through Revelation over a six-week period in 1953.

His books include:
 Light Through an Eastern Window
Robert Speller & Sons; Publishers (1963) 
The Way International: American Christian Press (1987). 
 Orientalisms of the Bible - Volumes 1 & 2
Munkus Publishing Company, INC. (1969, 1974)
The Way International: American Christian Press (1984). 
In 1980,  Reverend Bo Reahard compiled several of Pillai's teachings in his work Old and New Testament Orientalisms - Teachings of Bishop K.C. Pillai and in 2010, Jeanie Strand Chilton published the work Eastern Customs of the Bible: The Teachings of Bishop K. C. Pillai.

References

External links
Bishop KC Pillai

1900 births
1970 deaths
Indian Christian theologians
Indian Oriental Orthodox Christians
20th-century Oriental Orthodox bishops
Oriental Orthodox biblical scholars